The 2014 ADAC Rallye Deutschland was the ninth round of the 2014 World Rally Championship season. The event was based in Trier, Germany, and started on 22 August and finished on 24 August after eighteen special stages, totaling 324.3 competitive kilometres.

Hyundai driver Thierry Neuville earned his first ever World Rally Championship victory of his career. It was also the first rally of the season not to be won by either the Volkswagen of Sébastien Ogier or Jari-Matti Latvala as they had both crashed out during the event. It was the first non-VW victory since the previous year's German Rally won by Citroën's Dani Sordo, ending VW's streak of twelve consecutive WRC rally victories dating back to the 2013 Rally Australia. It was also Hyundai World Rally Team's first victory in the WRC having returned to the sport in 2014 after an eleven-year absence. Neuville became only the second Belgian rally driver to win a WRC event; the other being François Duval when he won the 2005 Rally Australia.

Entry list

Results

Event standings

Special stages

Power Stage
The "Power stage" was a  stage at the end of the rally.

Standings after the rally

WRC

Drivers' Championship standings

Manufacturers' Championship standings

Other

WRC2 Drivers' Championship standings

WRC3 Drivers' Championship standings

Junior WRC Drivers' Championship standings

References

Results – juwra.com/World Rally Archive	
Results – ewrc-results.com

Deutschland
Rallye Deutschland
Rallye Deutschland